Litchurch is an area of the city of Derby in Derbyshire, England. Originally an obscure locality on the edge of Derby, rapid urbanisation and population growth in the 19th century led to it briefly existing as a separately governed local authority between 1860 and 1888, prior to once again being absorbed by its neighbour.

History
The name Litchurch is of probable Anglo-Saxon origin, and may possibly derive from either Luda's Church or Littlechurch. One theory is that it originally referred to a now lost settlement centred on St Peter's Church in Derby. The earliest reference to Litchurch is in the Domesday Book when it was also one the hundreds of Derbyshire, meaning that at one time it was the meeting place for the hundred court. By 1300, it had been combined with the neighbouring hundred of Morleston.

In 1757 Thomas Borrow, Derby's Town Clerk, married Anne Ault of Loughborough and came into the use of £4,000 and lands and property in Litchurch. Up to the 19th century, Litchurch was a locality within the borough of Derby, however the coming of the railway industry to the area from 1839 onwards was the catalyst for a huge expansion of Derby's population, particularly to the south of the town centre in the area around Derby railway station. The Litchurch area was one of these growing suburbs, to the extent that in 1860 it was extracted from the borough of Derby to become a township in its own right. In 1866 it also became a civil parish.

Litchurch's brief independent existence lasted only until 1888 when it was re-absorbed into the newly created county borough of Derby. Since then, it has had no officially defined administrative function. Indeed the use of the name itself has fallen into decline in recent decades,  many of the residential streets at the heart of 19th century Litchurch having been obliterated in the 1970s to facilitate the expansion of the neighbouring Derbyshire Royal Infirmary.

An early map of Derby dated 1819 shows The Liberty Of Litchurch. A street name-plate located on Normanton Road, next to Grove Street, identifies the area as "Normanton Road- Litchurch". The area also had a gallows located in what is now Derby Arboretum. Litchurch leant its name to the Midland Railway's Derby Litchurch Lane Works.

References

External links

Areas of Derby
Former civil parishes in Derbyshire